The Liverpool County Football Combination was a football league based in Merseyside, England. It was founded in 1908 and had its first season in 1909–10. A second division was quickly formed, and the league ran with two divisions for the majority of its existence.

The league had a knockout competition, the George Mahon Cup, for the entire duration of its existence.

The league's last season was 2005–06, when the league champions were Speke. At the conclusion of the 2005–06 season, the league merged with the I Zingari League to form a new competition – the Liverpool County Premier League, which took the County Combination's former place at step 7 (or level 11) of the English football league system and as a feeder to the North West Counties Football League First Division. The George Mahon Cup is still contested by teams in the new league.

Season summary

References

 
Sports competitions in Liverpool
Defunct football leagues in England
1908 establishments in England
Football in Merseyside